Robert Warshow (1917–1955) was an American author associated with the New York Intellectuals. He is best known for his criticism of film and popular culture for Commentary and The Partisan Review. Born in New York City and raised in its Bronx borough, he graduated from the University of Michigan in 1938. He briefly wrote for The New Leader before being stationed in Washington, D.C. as a member of the Army Signal Corps during World War II.

Among the articles published in Warshow's short lifetime were "The Westerner" and "The Gangster as Tragic Hero", analyses of the Western movie and the gangster movie genre from a cultural standpoint. He also penned essays praising playwright Clifford Odets as well as George Herriman's newspaper comic strip Krazy Kat. "The 'Idealism' of Julius and Ethel Rosenberg" showed the executed American Stalinists in a brutally honest light. In an critique of The Crucible Warshow argued that Arthur Miller was not as competent a dramatist as was perceived. After Fredric Wertham and Gershon Legman, Warshow was the first serious critic to write about EC Comics and its Mad magazine, albeit from a measured and equivocal perspective.

Warshow died of a heart attack at the age of 37. Most of his published work was collected in the book The Immediate Experience in 1962. An expanded edition was released by Harvard University Press in 2001.

Compare
 Gilbert Seldes
 Otis Ferguson
 Manny Farber
 James Agee
 Andrew Sarris
 Pauline Kael

Book
 Robert Warshow: Immediate Experience. Movies, Comics, Theatre and Other Aspects of Popular Culture, Doubleday, Garden City, NY, 1962. 282 pp. With a contribution by Lionel Trilling.
 Robert Warshow: The Immediate Experience. Movies, Comics, Theatre and Other Aspects of Popular Culture, Harvard University Press, Cambridge, Mass., 2001. 302 pp. Expanded reprint, including Lionel Trilling, new contributions from David Denby and Stanley Cavell.

References

External links
 The Study of Man: Paul, the Horror Comics, and Dr. Wertham. In: Commentary Magazine, June 1954.

1917 births
1955 deaths
American film critics
American literary critics
Comics critics
Jewish American writers
University of Michigan alumni
20th-century American non-fiction writers
Journalists from New York City
20th-century American Jews
United States Army personnel of World War II